West Rounton is a village and civil parish in the Hambleton District of North Yorkshire, England.

History

The name Rounton derives from the Old English hrung, and tūn (rung-town). The first part refers to a type of bridge made with poles, often built over marshy ground. Historically, the village was in the wapentake of Allertonshire, today being in the Hambleton District.

The nearest railway station was just outside the village, which opened in June 1852, and closed in September 1939.

The church of St Oswald dates from the 12th century and was completely rebuilt in 1860 by architect James Pritchett. It is a grade II* listed building. Historically the church was dedicated to St James, a listing from 1835 shows it as St James in the parish of Rouncton, West.

West Rounton has one pub, the Horseshoe Inn. It is also home to Whitegates Nursery & Stamfrey Farm Organics which is known for its clotted cream products.

References

Sources

External links

Villages in North Yorkshire
Civil parishes in North Yorkshire